Florian Floto (born 12 April 1988) is a German male recurve archer from Braunschweig and part of the German national team. 
 
He has competed internationally since the 2008 European Indoor Championships in Turin. There, he finished in 6th place individually and won the silver medal with the German team. In 2010, Floto won Gold with the German team at the European Championships in Rovereto, in the individual competition he finished in fourth place.

He won the gold medal at the 2016 World Indoor Archery Championships in the men's team event and represented Germany at the 2016 Summer Olympics in Rio de Janeiro where he finished in 9th place. In Rio, Floto lost 4–6 in the round of 16 against eventual gold medalist Ku Bon-chan.

Floto represents the Braunschweig-based Schützenverein Querum in domestic competitions, and has won several German championship titles with the club, both in individual and team events. He is an electrician by profession.

References

External links
 
 
 
 
 

1988 births
Living people
German male archers
Olympic archers of Germany
Archers at the 2016 Summer Olympics
Sportspeople from Braunschweig
21st-century German people